Hapoel Kfar Shalem is an Israeli football club based in the Kfar Shalem neighbourhood of Tel Aviv. They are currently in Liga Alef South division, and play home matches at Southern Sportech.

History
The club was founded in 1958, and started at Liga Dalet, the lowest tier of Israeli football at the time. However, they were quickly promoted to Liga Gimel, and prior to the 1963–64 season, they were promoted to Liga Bet by the Israeli Football Association, after winning a special draw, in order to make an even number of clubs in Liga Bet North B division.

In the following season, the club was transferred to Liga Bet South A division, and made history by winning the division, and promotion to Liga Alef, the second tier of Israeli football at the time. the club finished their first season in Liga Alef South in the 11th place. however, in the following season, which was actually the "double season" of 1966–68, the club finished bottom with 10 wins out of 60 matches, and relegated back to Liga Bet.

By the late 1980s, the club returned to Liga Alef (now as third tier), and in 1995 were promoted to Liga Artzit, and made a return to the second tier of Israeli football after 27 years. however, their spell in Liga Artzit lasted one season, as they finished bottom at the 1995–96 season with 4 wins out of 30 matches, and relegated back to Liga Alef.

In the 2006–07 season, the club finished runners-up in Liga Alef South behind champions, Hapoel Maxim Lod. however, as the latter folded, Kfar Shalem was promoted instead to Liga Artzit (now as third tier). in the following season in Liga Artzit, the club finished bottom once more, with 4 wins out of 33 matches, and relegated back to Liga Alef (now as third tier, following the closure of Liga Artzit in 2009), where they played until their promotion to the second division in 2020.

Current squad
 As to 7 July 2022

Honours

League

External links
Hapoel Kfar Shalem  Israel Football Association

References

Football clubs in Israel
Hapoel football clubs
Hapoel Kfar Shalem F.C.
Hapoel Kfar Shalem F.C.
Hapoel Kfar Shalem F.C.
Arab-Israeli football clubs